Saint Johns is an unincorporated community in Butler Township, DeKalb County, Indiana.

History
Saint Johns once contained a post office called DeKalb. It operated between 1840 and 1905.

Geography

References

Unincorporated communities in DeKalb County, Indiana
Unincorporated communities in Indiana